Kell may refer to:

People
 Kell (given name), including a list of people and fictional characters with the name
 Kell (surname), including a list of people and fictional characters with the name
 Kell (footballer) (José Clebson Augustinho, born 1980), a Brazilian footballer

Places
 Kell (volcano), Kamchatka Peninsula, Russia
 Kell, Illinois, U.S.
 Kell am See, Trier-Saarburg district, Rhineland-Palatinate, Germany

Other uses
Kell antigen system, a group of antigens on the human red blood cell surface
Kell dragon, a fictional creature in the Star Wars universe
Kell factor, a parameter used to limit the bandwidth of a sampled image signal
Book of Kells, an 8th-century compilation of the 4 gospels of the bible
An oast house kiln
Tribal leaders of the Fallen in the video game Destiny

See also
 
 
 Kel (disambiguation)
 Kells (disambiguation)
 Kelly (disambiguation)
 Kehl, a town in Germany
 Kehl (surname)